Marjatta Moulin (née Heimolainen; 23 November 1926 – 6 November 2018) was a Finnish fencer. She competed in the women's individual foil event at the 1960 Summer Olympics.

References

External links
 

1926 births
2018 deaths
Finnish female foil fencers
Olympic fencers of Finland
Fencers at the 1960 Summer Olympics
People from Mänttä-Vilppula
Sportspeople from Pirkanmaa